Athanase Coquerel may refer to:

Athanase Laurent Charles Coquerel (1795–1868), French Protestant theologian
Athanase Josué Coquerel (1820–1875), French Protestant theologia, son of Athanase Laurent Charles Coquerel